Ben is the ninth album by Brazilian artist Jorge Ben, released in 1972. The album has one of Jorge Ben's most famous songs, "Taj Mahal", and "Fio Maravilha", paying homage to Flamengo's iconic striker Fio Maravilha.

"Taj Mahal" and Rod Stewart 
Ben filed a copyright infringement lawsuit claiming Rod Stewart's song "Da Ya Think I'm Sexy?" had been derived from "Taj Mahal". The case was "settled amicably" according to Ben. Stewart admits "unconscious plagiarism" of Ben's tune in his 2012 autobiography.

Track listing 
All songs composed by Jorge Ben.

References

Further reading

External links 
 

Jorge Ben albums
1972 albums
Philips Records albums